Edward Reese Roberts (October 4, 1892 – August 14, 1956) was an American track and field athlete who competed in the 1920 Summer Olympics. He was born in Avon, Illinois and died in Opa-locka, Florida. In 1920 he finished seventh in the 56 pound weight throw competition.

He graduated from Harvard University and Harvard Law School.

References

External links

1892 births
1956 deaths
American male shot putters
Olympic track and field athletes of the United States
Athletes (track and field) at the 1920 Summer Olympics
People from Avon, Illinois
Olympic weight throwers
Harvard Crimson men's track and field athletes
Harvard Law School alumni